Hart often refers to:
 Hart (deer)

Hart may also refer to:

Organizations 
 Hart Racing Engines, a former Formula One engine manufacturer
 Hart Skis, US ski manufacturer
 Hart Stores, a Canadian chain of department stores
 Hart's Reptile World, a zoo in Oregon, United States
 Harts Stores, a defunct American chain of department stores

People
 Hart (given name)
 Hart (surname)
 Hart family, a family of Canadian professional wrestlers, plus some American and British wrestlers related by marriage
 The Hart Foundation, a number of tag teams or stables, most of them featuring second-generation members of the above family
 The Hart Dynasty, a late-2000s WWE stable that included third-generation members of the family
 Hart family murders, a 2018 murder–suicide by Jennifer and Sarah Hart, who murdered their six adopted children

Places
Austria:
 Hart, Austria

Australia:
 Hart, Northern Territory, a locality
 Hart, South Australia, a locality
 Cape Hart Conservation Park, a protected area in South Australia

Greenland:
 Hart Glacier (Greenland)

United Kingdom:
 Hart (district), Hampshire, England
 Hart, County Durham, England
 Hart Fell, a hill in Scotland

United States:
 Hart, California
 Hart, Michigan
 Hart, Minnesota
 Hart, Missouri
 Hart, Macon County, Missouri
 Hart, Texas
 Hart County (disambiguation)
 Hart Island (disambiguation)
 Hart Township (disambiguation)

Buildings 

 Hart House (Alberta), historic house of the Hart wrestling family
 Hart House (University of Toronto), a student centre

Weapons systems 
 Hawker Hart, a Royal Air Force biplane light-bomber
 USS Hart, US Navy ships

Music 
 Hart (album), a 2008 album by rapper Brainpower

Computing 
 A hardware thread in RISC-V processor architecture

See also
 HART (disambiguation)
 Harte (disambiguation)
 Harts (disambiguation)
 Hartt
 Heart (disambiguation)
 Justice Hart (disambiguation)
 Major Hart River